The thoracic spinal nerve 8 (T8) is a spinal nerve of the thoracic segment.

It originates from the spinal column from below the thoracic vertebra 8 (T8).

References

Spinal nerves